The α-factor is used to predict the solid–liquid interface type of a material during solidification.

Method
According to John E. Gruzleski in his book Microstructure Development During Metalcasting (1996):

α = (L/k*TE)*(η/v)

where  L is latent heat of fusion; k is Boltzmann’s constant; TE is equilibrium freezing temperature; η is the number of nearest neighbours an atom has in the interface plane; and v is the number of nearest neighbours in the bulk solid.

Since L/TE = ΔSf

where ΔSf is the molar entropy of fusion of the material.

α = ΔSf/k(η/v)

According to Martin Glicksman in his book Principles of Solidification: An Introduction to Modern Casting and Crystal Growth Concepts (2011):

α = ΔSf/Rg(η1/Z)

where Rg is the universal gas constant. (η1/Z) is similar to previous, always 1/4 < (η1/Z) < 1.

References

Materials science